Parit Jawa is a mukim in Muar District, Johor, Malaysia.

Populated by Malay (mostly Jawa) ethnic 80%, Chinese 14% and Indian 6%. Situated at the curved of Malacca Straits with a famous Pantai Leka which is a centre of fresh aquatic sources with a very reasonable prices. Main connecting road of Jalan Jabbar, in conjunction with Jalan Mahmood, Jalan Temenggong Ahmad and Jalan Omar. 

Best and most popular cuisine Asam Pedas located near to the beach where's fishing boats are located. Heavy breakfast Muar style includes Nasi Lemak, Lontong, variety of Satay's, Me Rebus etc can be found everywhere nearby the small and cozy Parit Jawa. 

People's from surrounded district even from other states would come to get a fresh fishes at the main fish market called as 'Pasar Parit Jawa'. Selling fresh all kinds of fish, crabs, shrimps etc plus fresh vegetables at a very sensible price. 

Rules by Government of Johor, peoples living in harmony together multi-races. 

The boats not only for fishing, there are also providing special charter for fishing hobby at the island along Malacca Straits.

Geography
Parit Jawa spreads across 71 km2 of land with a population of 11,319 people.

References

 		 
https://youtu.be/Oxdpe0xkCaA 

Muar District
Mukims of Muar District